The thirty-fifth government of Israel, or the Netanyahu–Gantz government, was the government of Israel which was sworn in on 17 May 2020 and dissolved on 13 June 2021.

It was originally expected to be established following the April 2019 election, but after prime minister Benjamin Netanyahu was unable to form a government, the Knesset dissolved itself, thereby setting up a snap election that took place on 17 September 2019. Following the second election, no one was able to form a government again, and a third election took place on 2 March 2020. An agreement was ultimately reached on 20 April 2020, between Netanyahu and MK Benny Gantz on the formation of a national unity government. The Knesset, and with it the current government's legislative operations, was again dissolved on 23 December 2020, resulting in the 2021 election. On 13 June 2021, in a 60–59 vote with 1 abstention, the Knesset voted to approve the thirty-sixth government of Israel led by Naftali Bennett and Yair Lapid, ending Netanyahu's 12-year second tenure as prime minister and sending Likud into the opposition.

Background

First election – April 2019
After the April 2019 Israeli legislative election, the Blue and White faction leader Benny Gantz conceded, paving the way for incumbent Prime Minister Benjamin Netanyahu, leader of Likud, to begin talks with other parties to form a governing coalition.
On 15 and 16 April, leaders of all the parties who won seats in the Knesset met with President Reuven Rivlin to recommend a designated person to form a government. Netanyahu received recommendations from leaders representing 65 seats in the Knesset, whereas Gantz received recommendations from leaders representing only 45 seats in the Knesset. Leaders of the two Arab parties, representing 10 seats in the Knesset, declined to make any recommendation.

Recommendations

Second election – September 2019
A second election was held in September 2019. This time, Blue and White overcame the Likud by a single seat.

On election night, Avigdor Lieberman of Yisrael Beiteinu called for a "broad liberal government" that includes both Blue and White and Likud, and reiterated that he did not want to form any majority with the Arab parties. Benny Gantz claimed Prime ministership and Blue and White repeated that they would not form a government with Netanyahu, although they were open to one with Likud. Benyamin Netanyahu called for a "strong Zionist government". On the left, Labor-Gesher stated it wanted to bring Arab parties "to the table", some of which are open to recommending Gantz.

On 18 September, Netanyahu met with the emissaries of Yamina, Shas, and UTJ, to build a right-wing bloc to negotiate together.

On 19 September, Rivlin, Netanyahu and Gantz met during a memorial ceremony for Shimon Peres. Netanyahu urged Gantz to speak with him about forming a unity government, for the sake of avoiding a third election. Speaking for Blue and White, Gantz and Lapid both rejected Netanyahu's offer, saying Blue and White had won, and that Gantz had the right to lead a unity government committed to liberal policies on social issues, and thus refusing to discuss forming such a government with Netanyahu as long as right-wing religious parties were included. Lapid remarked that "if Netanyahu steps aside, we'll have a unity government". Lieberman likewise accused Netanyahu of "deception" by offering a unity government, but conditioning it on the inclusion of religious parties.

The same day, Gantz met with Nitzan Horowitz, leader of the Democratic Union. His aides said they expect a meeting with other party leaders, Odeh and Peretz. Labor-Gesher's six MKs could allow Netanyahu's bloc of 55 to find a majority. Likud thus reportedly offered Peretz the Finance portfolio, and a raise of the minimum wage, but the same sources say Peretz turned down the offer, which goes against a campaign vow. Netanyahu met with Degel HaTorah MKs, who, along with other Haredi parties (Shas, Agudat Yisrael), are starting to backtrack on their refusal not to govern with Lapid, in the case Lapid himself U-turns on Netanyahu. Lieberman was equivocal as to whether he would support Gantz, fearing to be sidelined from a unity government, or one that includes Haredim. According to Channel 13, Gantz reportedly promised to include Yisrael Beiteinu in any coalition.

Joint list and balad
On 21 September, the 13 MKs from the Joint List met together. 10 of them—with three Balad MKs dissenting—expressed their readiness to nominate Gantz if he meets "basic demands" on the peace process, the Arab community's interests, and the Jewish nation-state law. President Rivlin met with party leaders on 22 September for the first day of talks. On 22 September 2019, the Joint List leader Ayman Odeh declared that the Joint List had agreed, by internal majority voting, to endorse Benny Gantz for prime minister. Though initial reports suggested that the Joint List's recommendation gave Gantz a 57 to 55 edge, Rivlin revealed on 23 September that three Balad MKs—elected as part of the Joint List—demanded that their names be removed from a list of nominees of Gantz. After a day of confusion, Tibi and Odeh—leaders of the Joint List—wrote a letter to Rivlin clarifying that the Joint List did not, in fact, have a unity agreement that legally binds individual parties to follow the party's nomination for the prime minister. As such, Balad's three MKs were legally allowed to ignore the Joint List's recommendation. As a result, Netanyahu lead Gantz in tallied recommendations by a 55 to 54 margin, with Yisrael Beiteinu and Balad not recommending anyone.

Recommendations
President Rivlin met with representatives of Blue and White, Likud, the Joint List, Shas and Yisrael Beiteinu on 22 September to ask for recommendations on whom to select for prime minister. The next day, he met with members of United Torah Judaism, Yamina, Labor-Gesher and the Democratic Union.

Rivlin officially chose Netanyahu to form the next government on 25 September, though he conditioned it on Netanyahu giving back the mandate if he failed to form a government, to avoid another dissolution of the Knesset.

Netanyahu agreed to this stipulation and called for a "unity government" between himself, his allied religious parties, and Gantz. Gantz refused, on the basis that he had promised during the election not to join a Netanyahu-led coalition, and furthermore that a coalition that included all of Netanyahu's allies would not truly be a unity government. Efforts to resolve the deadlock were unsuccessful, and on 21 October Netanyahu returned the mandate to Rivlin. On 23 October, Rivlin's office tasked Gantz with forming a government; this mandate was given back to Rivlin on 21 November. From that day, MKs had three weeks in which they could choose to nominate any of themselves to serve as PM. The selected MK would have had to secure the support of 61 MKs. However, no MK was able to form a government, and it was determined on 12 December that a third election would take place on 2 March 2020.

Third election – March 2020
 On 8 March 2020, Lieberman gave Gantz his backing to form a new government. The next day, the Joint List agreed to work with Gantz and Lieberman to oust Netanyahu. Orly Levy announced on 10 March that she would not support a minority government and had left the Labor–Gesher–Meretz alliance. Blue and White MKs Zvi Hauser and Yoaz Hendel had previously stated that they would not support a government that relied on the Joint List's support. Lieberman and Labor party leader Amir Peretz also reaffirmed on 11 March that an alliance with the Joint List would not change their party's position on forming a political alliance with Gantz. The elected MKs were sworn in on 16 March 2020. On 15 March, Israeli President Reuven Rivlin announced that he had asked Gantz to form the new government after Gantz received support from 61 of the 120 MKs.

Prior to the election, Gantz vowed to form a government that would not include Netanyahu. However, after the election and with the outbreak of the COVID-19 pandemic, Gantz reversed his stance and announced he was willing to support an emergency coalition with Netanyahu. On 21 March, Netanyahu announced negotiations were completed for a national unity government with a rotating prime ministership where Netanyahu served first, to later be replaced by Gantz, though Gantz denied this and claimed negotiations were still ongoing.

Speakership constitutional crisis
Speaker Yuli Edelstein had held the job since 2013 and kept his job throughout the interim Knessets of 2019. He refused to leave this time and shut down the body as soon as it was sworn in. Edelstein proposed that left and right coalitions hold equal numbers of members in the parliamentary committees with Likud chairpersons, but the opposition refused. They then went to the courts to force the assembly to reopen, in which they were successful.

On 23 March, the Supreme Court of Israel unanimously ruled that Edelstein should hold a vote on his replacement as Speaker, criticizing him for defying a previous non-binding ruling by the court advising him to do so. Rather than comply, Edelstein stepped down as the Speaker of the Knesset on 25 March, the first time that a speaker has unilaterally resigned. The court subsequently ruled later on 25 March that Amir Peretz, as the most senior member of the Knesset, would be granted the authority to convene the Knesset for a vote on a new speaker. Gantz then announced that he would stand as a candidate for speaker, resulting in a split of the Blue and White coalition as well as announcements of a deal in which he would serve as speaker until a unity government is formed under Netanyahu, and then would serve as defense minister in the unity government until replacing Netanyahu as prime minister in September 2021. On 26 March, Meir Cohen withdrew his candidacy as speaker and the Knesset elected Gantz as speaker.

Recommendations (March–April 2020)

President Rivlin met with all elected parties and received their recommendations for prime minister on 15 March. Rivlin gave Gantz the mandate to form a government on 16 March.

Before the election, Gantz vowed to form a government that would not include Netanyahu. Initially an attempt was made to form a minority government with external support from the Joint List, however this initiative promptly collapsed as MKs Yoaz Hendel and Zvi Hauser announced they would vote against such a government, citing an electoral promise not to lean on the Joint List which includes "terror supporters" such as Balad. During the COVID-19 pandemic in Israel, Gantz reversed his stance and announced he was willing to support an emergency coalition with Netanyahu. On 21 March, Netanyahu announced negotiations were completed for a national unity government with a rotating prime ministership where Netanyahu would serve first, and would later be replaced by Gantz, although Gantz denied this and claimed negotiations were still ongoing. On 26 March, one day after Knesset Speaker Yuli Edelstein resigned, Gantz instead agreed to become Speaker of the Knesset. The fact that right-wingers in Likud Prime Minister Benjamin Netanyahu's coalition agreed to support Gantz's bid to become speaker put the future of the Blue and White alliance in jeopardy. The same day Gantz was elected as the new Speaker of the Knesset by a margin of 74–18.

On 27 March 2020, it was revealed that a major obstacle to a possible long-term alliance between Gantz and Netanyahu emerged with regard to implementing U.S. President Donald Trump's Middle East peace plan. Barak Ravid of Israel's Channel 13 news revealed that Gantz, despite previously claiming that he wanted to implement the peace plan, still wanted to hold peace talks with the Palestinians, which Trump and Netanyahu still opposed. Ravid stated that this would likely make the upcoming deal between Gantz and Netanyahu short-lived. As part of the proposed coalition deal between Netanyahu and Gantz, Gantz was to replace Netanyahu as Prime Minister of Israel after 18 months' government. Gantz's term as prime minister-designate was going to end on 14 April, though President Rivlin extended it until 15 April.

Coalition government 
On 20 April 2020, Gantz and Netanyahu announced that agreement on a unity government had been reached. The deal would involve both parties sharing power, and Gantz and Netanyahu taking turns being prime minister. Under the terms of the agreement Netanyahu was to be prime minister until October 2021, with Gantz serving as vice prime minister. After that time the men were to exchange roles. However, should Netanyahu leave the premiership early, Gantz was to take over the role. Several watchdog groups in Israel, including the Movement for Quality Government in Israel and other groups, reacted to the news by petitioning the Supreme Court to block the formation of the government due to the indictment of Netanyahu.

On 7 May 2020, Netanyahu won the support of 72 MKs to form a government, with Rivlin giving Netanyahu a two-week mandate to form a government shortly after. The parties who gave their support included Blue and White, Likud, Derekh Eretz, Gesher, Shas and United Torah Judaism as well as two of the three members of the Labor Party.

Members of government
On 17 May 2020, the following were announced to the Knesset as members in the new government:

Ministers

Deputy ministers

See also
 2020 in Israel
 2020s in political history
 List of members of the twenty-third Knesset

References

External links

 Thirty-fifth government of Israel. Knesset
 Thirty-fifth government of Israel. Israel Ministry of Foreign Affairs
 Thirty-fifth government of Israel. Jewish Virtual Library

 35
2020 establishments in Israel
2021 disestablishments in Israel
Cabinets established in 2020
Cabinets disestablished in 2021
2020 in Israeli politics
2021 in Israeli politics
 35
23rd Knesset (2020–2021)
+35
Rotation governments